The E. A. Durham House, also known as the Durham-Peters Residence, is a historic home located at Sistersville, Tyler County, West Virginia. It was built in 1921, and is a 20-room Italian Renaissance Revival-style residence.  It features pale stone and stucco and a low-pitched green tile roof.  The interior features mahogany paneling, a six-foot Carrara marble fireplace, and Dresden chandelier.

It was listed on the National Register of Historic Places in 1973.

References

Houses on the National Register of Historic Places in West Virginia
Renaissance Revival architecture in West Virginia
Houses completed in 1921
Houses in Tyler County, West Virginia
Italian Renaissance Revival architecture in the United States
National Register of Historic Places in Tyler County, West Virginia